Lee Jong-Min  (21 May 1987) is a South Korean footballer

Club statistics

References

External links 

1987 births
Living people
Association football defenders
South Korean footballers
South Korean expatriate footballers
J1 League players
J2 League players
Japan Football League players
Montedio Yamagata players
Tochigi SC players
Avispa Fukuoka players
Matsumoto Yamaga FC players
Expatriate footballers in Japan
South Korean expatriate sportspeople in Japan
Sportspeople from Gyeonggi Province